Polina Kouklina (born 14 July 1986 in Moscow), known as Polina Kuklina, is a Russian fashion model. She has appeared on the cover of Japanese, Korean, and Russian Vogue.

Career
She began modeling in fashion-shows in 2003 and has walked for labels such as Prada, Alexander McQueen and Louis Vuitton. She modelled for Nina Ricci in January 2005, and was photographed by Mark Squires for Interview in September 2005.

References

External links

Photos of Polina Kouklina at Vogue.it

Portfolio at FM Modeling Agency
Portfolio at City Models Agency
Portfolio at D'Management Group
Portfolio at M4 Models Management
Polina Kuklina's website

1986 births
Living people
Female models from Moscow